Boyton may refer to:

Places in England 
Boyton, Cornwall
Boyton, Suffolk
Boyton, Wiltshire

People 
Ian Boyton (born 1974), English cricketer
James Boyton (1855–1926), British estate agent and Conservative politician
Paul Boyton (1848–1924), US showman and adventurer
Rosemary Boyton, British immunologist
An alternate spelling of the surname of the Hambledon Club cricketer John Bayton

See also 
 Boyton Cross
 Boyton End, Essex
 Boyton End, Suffolk